The 2024 United States House of Representatives elections in New York will be held on November 5, 2024, to elect the 26 U.S. representatives from the State of New York, one from all 26 of the state's congressional districts. The elections will coincide with the 2024 U.S. presidential election, as well as other elections to the House of Representatives, elections to the United States Senate, and various state and local elections.

District 1

The 1st district is based on the eastern end and North Shore of Long Island, including the Hamptons, the North Fork, Riverhead, Port Jefferson, Smithtown, and Huntington, all in Suffolk County. The incumbent is Republican Nick LaLota, who was elected with 54.1% of the vote in 2022.

Republican primary

Candidates

Potential
Nick LaLota, incumbent U.S. Representative

General election

Predictions

District 3

The 3rd district is based on the North Shore of Nassau County, including all of the towns of North Hempstead and Glen Cove, most of the town of Oyster Bay, and a small part of Hempstead, and parts of Northeast Queens, including the neighborhoods of Whitestone, Beechhurst, Little Neck, and Douglaston. The incumbent is Republican George Santos, who flipped the district and was elected with 54.1% of the vote in 2022. Santos has faced heavy calls to resign following revelations that he fabricated a majority of his resumé, including from the Nassau County Republican Party.

Republican primary

Candidates

Filed paperwork
George Santos, incumbent U.S. Representative

Potential
Andrea Catsimatidis, chair of the Manhattan Republican Party
Michael Durso, state assemblyman
Alison Esposito, former NYPD Deputy Inspector and nominee for Lieutenant Governor of New York in 2022
Michael LiPetri, former state assemblyman and candidate for the 2nd district in 2020
Mazi Melesa Pilip, Nassau County legislator
Elaine Phillips, Nassau County Comptroller and former state senator
Daniel Serota, mayor of Brookville

Declined
Bruce Blakeman, Nassau County Executive
Jack Martins, state senator and nominee in 2016

Democratic primary

Candidates
Declared 

Will Murphy, St. John’s Law Professor  https://nypost.com/2023/03/19/st-johns-law-professor-will-murphy-in-bid-to-replace-george-santos/?utm_campaign=iphone_nyp&utm_source=pasteboard_app

Filed paperwork
Josh Lafazan, Nassau County legislator and candidate in 2022

Publicly expressed interest
Melanie D'Arrigo, healthcare consultant and candidate in 2020 and 2022

Potential
Anna Kaplan, former state senator
Daniel Rosenthal, state assemblyman
Tom Suozzi, former U.S. Representative
Robert Zimmerman, public relations executive, Democratic National Committee member, and nominee in 2022

Declined
Jon Kaiman, former Suffolk County deputy executive and candidate in 2022 (running for North Hempstead town supervisor)
Reema Rasool, marketing executive and candidate in 2022 (endorsed Zimmerman)

General election

Predictions

District 4

The 4th district is based on the South Shore of Nassau County and is entirely within the town of Hempstead. The incumbent is Republican Anthony D'Esposito, who flipped the district and was elected with 51.8% of the vote in 2022.

Republican primary

Candidates

Potential
Anthony D'Esposito, incumbent U.S. Representative

Predictions

District 17

The 17th district is based in the Lower Hudson Valley, including all of Rockland and Putnam Counties, northern Westchester County, and a small part of Dutchess County. The incumbent is Republican Mike Lawler, who flipped the district and was elected with 49.3% of the vote in 2022.

Republican primary

Candidates

Potential
Mike Lawler, incumbent U.S. Representative

Democratic primary

Candidates

Publicly expressed interest
Mondaire Jones, member of the U.S. Commission on Civil Rights and former U.S. Representative

General election

Predictions

District 18

The 18th district is based in the mid-Hudson Valley, including all of Orange County and most of Dutchess and Ulster Counties. The incumbent is Democrat Pat Ryan, who was re-elected with 49.6% of the vote in 2022.

Democratic primary

Candidates

Potential
Pat Ryan, incumbent U.S. Representative

General election

Predictions

District 19

The 19th district stretches from the Upper Hudson Valley across the Catskill Mountains to parts of the Southern Tier and Finger Lakes, including Hudson, Woodstock, Monticello, Oneonta, Binghamton, and Ithaca. It includes all of Columbia, Greene, Sullivan, Delaware, Chenango, Cortland, Broome, Tioga, and Tompkins counties, and parts of Ostego and Ulster Counties. The incumbent is Republican Marc Molinaro, who flipped the district and was elected with 49.9% of the vote in 2022.

Republican primary

Candidates

Potential
Marc Molinaro, incumbent U.S. Representative

General election

Predictions

District 22

The 22nd district is based in Central New York and the Mohawk Valley, including Syracuse and Utica. It includes all of Onondaga, Oneida, and Madison Counties and a small sliver of Oswego County. The incumbent is Republican Brandon Williams, who was elected with 49.5% of the vote in 2022.

Republican primary

Candidates

Potential
Brandon Williams, incumbent U.S. Representative

Democratic primary

Candidates

Publicly expressed interest
Sarah Hood, DeWitt town board member and candidate in 2022

Withdrew
Katelyn Kriesel, Manlius city councilor

General election

Predictions

References

2024
New York
United States House of Representatives